Freddy Wittop (July 26, 1911 – February 2, 2001) was a costume designer. He enjoyed secondary careers as a dancer and college professor.

Born Frederick Wittop Koning in Bussum, Netherlands, Wittop emigrated with his family to Brussels, where he apprenticed at the age of thirteen with the resident designer at the Brussels Opera. Moving to Paris in 1931, he designed for the Folies Bergère and other music halls, creating costumes for Mistinguett and Josephine Baker, among others. He studied Spanish dance and, as Frederico Rey, began a professional career that led to international acclaim as he and his first partner, La Argentinita, performed worldwide. He also toured with Jose Greco and Tina Ramirez.

In 1942, Wittop designed costumes for the Ice Capades, George Abbott's Broadway musical Beat the Band, and Lucille Ball for her film melodrama The Big Street. Soon after this, Wittop joined the U.S. Armed Forces during World War II and served overseas for three and a half years. His service awarded him American citizenship. 

Once Wittop returned to America after the war, he had a stint dressing show girls and dancers at the Latin Quarter (nightclub) in New York City. He then formed his own dance company in 1951 and for the next seven years toured the US and Europe. He returned to theatre design at the behest of director Harold Clurman, who saw his show and asked him to design his 1959 Broadway production of George Bernard Shaw's Heartbreak House. He actively worked in New York for the next fourteen years.

In 1973, Wittop retired to Ibiza, where he remained for eleven years before returning to New York to work on two more projects before settling in Tequesta, Florida. He frequently traveled to Athens, Georgia, where he held a position as adjunct professor in the school of drama at the University of Georgia.

Wittop died at age 89 at the JFK Medical Center in Atlantis, Florida, on February 2, 2001, shortly after being chosen as the 2001 recipient of the Theatre Development Fund's Irene Sharaff Award for "lifetime achievement in theatrical costume design."

His original sketches have been showcased in museums and sold in art galleries throughout the country. A considerable amount of his personal collection is retained at the University of Georgia in the Hargrett Rare Book and Manuscript Library.

Productions
Source:

Carnival! (1961)
Subways Are For Sleeping (1961)
Hello, Dolly! (1964)
Bajour (1964)
Kelly (1965)
The Roar of the Greasepaint - The Smell of the Crowd (1965)
On a Clear Day You Can See Forever (1965)
I Do! I Do! (1966)
Breakfast at Tiffany's (1966)
The Happy Time (1968)
George M! (1968)
Dear World (1969)
A Patriot for Me (1969)
Lovely Ladies, Kind Gentlemen (1970)
The Three Musketeers (1984)
Wind in the Willows (1985)

Awards and nominations
Source:

References

External links
 
 
 Freddy Wittop costume designs, 1964-1968, held by the Billy Rose Theatre Division, New York Public Library for the Performing Arts
 Freddy Wittop papers, 1927-2005, held by the Hargrett Rare Book and Manuscript Library, University of Georgia
 W.H. Crain Costume and Scene Design Collection at the Harry Ransom Center

1911 births
2001 deaths
Costume designers
Dutch male dancers
Drama Desk Award winners
Tony Award winners
People from Bussum
University of Georgia faculty
Flamenco dancers
People from Tequesta, Florida
Dutch emigrants to Belgium
Belgian expatriates in France
Belgian emigrants to the United States